The Bermuda national cricket team toured the Netherlands in 2008. They played two One Day Internationals against the Netherlands.


ODI series

1st ODI

2nd ODI

External links
Series homepage at Cricinfo
Series homepage at CricketArchive

International cricket competitions in 2008
2008 in cricket